John Edwin Hull (May 26, 1895 – June 10, 1975) was a United States Army general, former Vice Chief of Staff of the United States Army, commanded Far East Command from 1953 to 1955 and the U.S. Army, Pacific from 1948 to 1949. He served in both world wars and was a contemporary of generals George Marshall and Omar Bradley. Because of his primary role in planning Allied operations throughout World War II, he was credited with having more experience integrating strategy with overseas operations than any other Army officer.

Hull was a pre-medical student at Miami University in Oxford, Ohio, prior to joining the Army in 1917. He received an honorary LLD in 1954. His military education included the Army War College and the National War College.

Prior to the U.S. Army, Pacific, Hull was the Commanding General for Army Ground Forces in the Pacific. From 1953 to 1955 he was Commander in Chief of the Far East Command after the conclusion of the Korean War. This was his last major assignment before retiring on April 30, 1955.

Other significant assignments for Hull involved major staff duties in Washington, D.C. Among these were Director of the Weapons Evaluation Group and Deputy Chief of Staff for Operations and Administration for the Office of the Secretary of Defense. At the outbreak of World War II he was assigned to the War Department.
Hull died on June 10, 1975.

Awards and decorations

See also

References

Generals of World War II

|-

|-

1895 births
1975 deaths
Burials at Arlington National Cemetery
Miami RedHawks football players
People from Greenfield, Ohio
Recipients of the Distinguished Service Medal (US Army)
Recipients of the Legion of Merit
Recipients of the Silver Star
United States Army Vice Chiefs of Staff
United States Army War College alumni
United States Army personnel of World War I
United States Army generals of World War II
United States Army generals
National War College alumni